Simranjit Thandi (born 11 October 1999) is an English professional footballer who plays as a defender for Karmiotissa on loan from AEK Larnaca.

Career

Thandi came through the Leicester City academy before joining Stoke City in 2018. He joined Stafford Rangers on a one-month loan in February 2019.

He was released in June 2019 and signed for AEK Larnaca FC in July 2019. On 1 August 2019, Thandi made his professional debut in the UEFA Europa League as a 70th minute substitute during a 0-4 away win over Levski Sofia.

International career
Thandi made three appearances for the England under-17 national football team in February 2016.

Career statistics

References

1999 births
Living people
People from Leicester 
Association football defenders
England youth international footballers
English footballers
English people of Punjabi descent
British sportspeople of Indian descent
British Asian footballers
Leicester City F.C. players
Stoke City F.C. players
Stafford Rangers F.C. players
AEK Larnaca FC players
Northern Premier League players
Cypriot First Division players
English expatriate footballers
Expatriate footballers in Cyprus
Karmiotissa FC players